Yukimura is a masculine Japanese given name and a Japanese surname.

Possible writings
Yukimura can be written using different combinations of kanji characters. Here are some examples: 

幸村, "happiness, village"
幸斑, "happiness, speck"
幸邑, "happiness, village"
行村, "to go, village"
行斑, "to go, speck"
行邑, "to go, village"
恭村, "respectful, village"
之村, "of, village"
雪村, "snow, village"
雪斑, "snow, speck"
雪邑, "snow, village"

The name can also be written in hiragana ゆきむら or katakana ユキムラ.

Notable people with the given name Yukimura
Yukimura Sanada (1567–1615), Japanese samurai

Notable people with  the surname Yukimura
Eri Yukimura (幸村 恵理, born 1998), Japanese voice actress 
Izumi Yukimura (雪村 いづみ, born 1937), Japanese singer and actress
Makoto Yukimura (幸村 誠, born 1976), Japanese manga artist

Fictional characters 
Tokine Yukimura (雪村 時音), a main character in Kekkaishi
Keiko Yukimura (雪村 螢子), a character in the YuYu Hakusho series
Yukimura (幸村), one of Weed's brothers in Ginga Legend Weed
Anzu Yukimura (雪村 杏), a character from Da Capo II
Seiichi Yukimura (幸村 精市), a character from The Prince of Tennis
Kira Yukimura (キラ・ユキムラ), a character from Teen Wolf (2011 TV series)
Yukimura Kusunoki (楠 幸村), a character from Haganai
Tooru Yukimura (雪村 透), a character from Aoharu x Machinegun
Aguri Yukimura (雪村 あぐり), a character from Assassination Classroom
Chizuru Yukimura (雪村 千鶴), a character from Hakuouki
Yukimura (ユキムラ), a character from Fire Emblem Fates

Places
Yukimura (restaurant), Michelin 3-star sushi restaurant in Azabu-Jūban, Minato, Tokyo, Japan

Japanese-language surnames
Japanese masculine given names